Ogooué-Maritime is the westernmost of Gabon's nine provinces. It covers an area of 22,890 km.  The provincial capital is Port-Gentil. It has a 2013 census population of 157,562.

The shores of Ogooué-Maritime are of the Gulf of Guinea to the northwest and the South Atlantic Ocean to the southwest.  It is the only coastal province without a foreign border.  On land, it borders the following provinces:
Estuaire – north
Moyen-Ogooué – northeast
Ngounié – east
Nyanga – southeast

Departments

Ogooué-Maritime is divided into 3 departments:
Bendje Department (Port-Gentil)
Etimboue Department (Omboue)
Ndougou Department (Gamba)

References

 
Provinces of Gabon